Jefferson is an unincorporated community in Washington Township, Clinton County, Indiana.  The town is named for U.S. President Thomas Jefferson.

History
Jefferson was one of the earliest settlements in Clinton County, being laid out and platted before 1829 and situated in the most thickly settled part of the county at that point.  It early on had a post office, which handled mail bi-weekly, and a store operated by Abner Baker and Aaron Southard which sold supplies both to the early pioneers and to the Indians.

When Clinton County organized in 1830, local landowners led by Abner Baker lobbied for Jefferson to be chosen as the county seat, but its non-central location worked against it.  John Pence offered  of land and $100 for the establishment of the seat at Frankfort, and the commissioners appointed to select the site accepted.

A post office was established at Jefferson in 1830, and remained in operation until it was discontinued in 1905.

Jefferson was the 1958 birthplace of the neofascist National States' Rights Party.

Geography

References

Unincorporated communities in Clinton County, Indiana